Man of war may refer to:

 Man-of-war, refers to any type of heavily armed warship from the 16th to the 19th centuries
 Man-of-war fish, a driftfish generally found in open sea or close to the Portuguese man o' war
 Max Manus: Man of War, a 2008 Norwegian World War II film
 Portuguese man o' war, also referred to as Portuguese man of war, a floating marine colonial hydrozoa
 "Man of War" (song), a song by Radiohead
 Man of War (video game), a 1997 naval combat strategy game
 Man of War gneisses, a sequence of metamorphosed igneous rocks found on the Lizard peninsular in Cornwall, UK
 Man of War, Fingal, Ireland, a small populated place

See also 
 Man o' War (1917–1947), an American Thoroughbred racehorse
 Manowar, an American heavy metal band
 Man O' War (disambiguation)
 Men of war (disambiguation)